Christopher Heaton-Harris (born 28 November 1967) is a British politician who has served as Secretary of State for Northern Ireland since 6 September 2022.

Early life and education
Born on 28 November 1967, Heaton-Harris attended the Tiffin School in Kingston upon Thames. He attended Wolverhampton Polytechnic,  which in 1992 became the University of Wolverhampton.

He worked for the family business at New Covent Garden Market, before taking over from his father running What4 Ltd for eleven years. At the 1997 general election he unsuccessfully contested the constituency of Leicester South. He again unsuccessfully contested the seat in the 2004 Leicester South by-election.

European Parliament
Heaton-Harris was elected to the European Parliament in 1999 as MEP for the East Midlands, and was re-elected in 2004. He was the Chief Whip of the Conservatives in the European Parliament from 2001 to March 2004.

Heaton-Harris sat on the Internal Market Committee, responsible for "co-ordination at Community level of national legislation in the sphere of the internal market and of the customs union", as well as the Central America Delegation and the Bulgaria Delegation.

He was a founding member of the Campaign for Parliamentary Reform, a cross-national, cross-party group of MEPs that campaigns for reforms within the parliament. Its manifesto includes creating one seat for the parliament (in Brussels), cleaning up the system for MEPs' expenses, and improving debate within the parliament.

Heaton-Harris was responsible for bringing the case of Marta Andreasen, the European Commission's Chief Accountant, to public attention in August 2002 and has been involved in fighting fraud, mismanagement and waste within the European Commission and other European institutions.

Prior to standing down in 2009, Heaton-Harris was the President of the Sports Intergroup, a group of approximately 40 MEPs who have an interest in sport and sporting issues.

From May 2006, he sought support within the European Union legislature for a letter to FIFA demanding that the Iranian national football team be thrown out of the 2006 World Cup because of then Iranian President Mahmoud Ahmadinejad's comments about the Holocaust being a lie. In 2012, Heaton-Harris described himself as a "fierce Eurosceptic".

Member of UK Parliament

Backbencher
Chris Heaton-Harris was a member of the Conservative A-List and was selected to succeed Tim Boswell as candidate for the safe Conservative constituency of Daventry in June 2006. He won the seat at the 2010 general election with a majority of 19,188.

In March 2012, Heaton-Harris was reported as being one of the Conservative MPs to have spoken critically of Party Co-Chairman Sayeeda Warsi at a meeting of the 1922 Committee, following Warsi's handling of Roger Helmer MEP's defection to UKIP.

Ministerial Career

Heaton-Harris was a whip in Theresa May's government from 2017 to 2018. He served as Deputy Leader of the House of Commons and Comptroller of the Household from January to June 2018. He was a Brexit Minister from 2018 to 2019, before resigning to support Andrea Leadsom's second Conservative leadership bid, which she lost to Boris Johnson. On 25 July 2019, he was appointed by Johnson as the Minister of State for Transport. 

He was appointed Minister of State for Europe on 19 December 2021 when ministerial responsibility for Europe was transferred out of the Cabinet Office and to the Foreign Office.  

In February 2022, he was appointed by Johnson as Chief Whip of the Conservative Party. Following Liz Truss's appointment as Prime Minister in September 2022, he was promoted to Secretary of State for Northern Ireland. On 8 September he made his first visit to Northern Ireland.
Heaton-Harris was appointed Vice-Chamberlain of the Household, a whips office sinecure on 15 July 2017. He was promoted to Leader of the House of Commons and Comptroller of the Household on 9 January 2018.

After the resignation of Boris Johnson and the following domino resignations of Conservative ministers, on 9 July 2018 Heaton-Harris was appointed as one of three Parliamentary Under-Secretaries of State at the Department for Exiting the European Union. 

On 8 February 2022, he was appointed as Chief Whip of the Conservative Party. He was subsequently sworn into the Privy Council of the United Kingdom.

Hospitality 
Heaton-Harris accepted tickets for himself and his family to attend four events at the London 2012 Olympics relating to swimming, diving, gymnastics, and the closing ceremony, as a gift from Coca-Cola. The value of the gifts (£11,750) was the highest amount received by any MP. He declared them in the Register of Members' Interests. Heaton-Harris was one of several MPs, including Labour's shadow whip Mark Tami, who received tickets worth £1,961 to the England v Germany game at the 2020 UEFA European Football Championship from Power Leisure Bookmakers.

Climate change 
In November 2012, covert video footage of Heaton-Harris discussing the role of James Delingpole in the Corby by-election were published on the website of The Guardian. The recording, made by Greenpeace, appeared to show the MP's support for Delingpole's independent, anti-windfarm candidacy, at a time when Heaton-Harris was engaged by the Conservatives to run the unsuccessful campaign of their own candidate, Christine Emmett.

Heaton-Harris indicated that this was linked to a plan by core members of the Conservative Party to emasculate the Climate Change Act by making its commitments advisory rather than mandatory. After Heaton-Harris apologised for the impression he gave in the video, Home Secretary Theresa May said he was guilty only of silly bragging, while Labour's Michael Dugher MP urged Prime Minister David Cameron to show leadership and punish him. The Corby by-election was subsequently lost by the Conservatives with a swing to Labour of 12.8 per cent.

Letters to universities 
In October 2017, the Eurosceptic Heaton-Harris wrote to the vice-chancellors of every university in the UK, requesting the names of academics lecturing on Brexit and copies of all course material, leading to claims of political interference in academic freedom, as well as censorship. The move was described as "McCarthyite" by Professor Kevin Featherstone, head of the European Institute at the London School of Economics, and "sinister" by Professor David Green, the vice-Chancellor of Worcester University who likened it to Newspeak and the Thought Police from George Orwell's Nineteen Eighty-Four: the Dean of Durham Law School, Thom Brooks, called it "dog whistle politics at its worst", while Lord Patten, Chancellor of Oxford University, called the letter an act of "idiotic and offensive Leninism". In addition, the letter attracted criticism from both pro-Remain and pro-Leave academics at Cambridge and London's Queen Mary universities, and a rebuke from Downing Street.

Responding the next day to the widespread criticism from both politicians and academics, universities minister Jo Johnson suggested that Heaton-Harris might have been researching a possible book on "the evolution of attitudes" to Europe, rather than acting in his role as a government minister, and "probably didn't appreciate the degree to which (the letter) would be misinterpreted", although there was no mention of any research for a possible book in the original letter. On 17 February 2019, Heaton-Harris said that there had never been any plans for a book.

European Research Group 
Heaton-Harris chaired the European Research Group (ERG), a group of Eurosceptic MPs, from 2010 until November 2016. Subscriptions totalling £13,850 were claimed as a parliamentary expense. At the same time he sat on the wide-ranging powers of the European Scrutiny Committee, set up to assess the legal and/or political importance of draft EU legislation.

Documents from the House of Commons catering department released via Freedom of Information to openDemocracy, show Heaton-Harris hosted an ERG breakfast meeting in October 2017, despite taking over as a government whip in July 2016. Continuing to chair the group while he was a member of the government led to an accusation of violating the Ministerial Code, section 7.12 of which states: "Ministers should take care to ensure that they do not become associated with non-public organisations whose objectives may in any degree conflict with Government policy and thus give rise to a conflict of interest." However, a government spokesperson stated that they did not view it as a breach.

Personal life
Heaton-Harris is married and has two children. He is a qualified football referee.

Honours
 He was sworn in as a member of Her Majesty's Most Honourable Privy Council on 16 February 2022 at Windsor Castle. This gave him the Honorific Prefix "The Right Honourable" for life.

References

External links
Chris Heaton-Harris MP official constituency website
Chris Heaton-Harris MP official Chris Heaton-Harris blog
Chris Heaton-Harris MP Conservative Party profile
Daventry Conservatives

Profile at European Parliament website

|-

Living people
1967 births
Alumni of the University of Wolverhampton 
Conservative Party (UK) MEPs
Conservative Party (UK) MPs for English constituencies
English football referees
Secretaries of State for Northern Ireland
Members of the Privy Council of the United Kingdom
MEPs for England 1999–2004
MEPs for England 2004–2009
People educated at Tiffin School
People from Epsom
Politicians from Leicestershire
Politics of Lincolnshire
UK MPs 2010–2015
UK MPs 2015–2017
UK MPs 2017–2019
UK MPs 2019–present
Free Enterprise Group